Robert Maclellan, 1st Lord Kirkcudbright (died 1641) was Provost of Kirkcudbright in 1607 and was best known for his riotous (and violent) behavior. .

Life
Robert was a direct descendant of the Laird of Bombie, Patrick Maclellan whom the 8th Earl of Douglas had murdered. 

The son of Sir Thomas Maclellan, Robert in his youth, found himself imprisoned in Blackness Castle, as punishment for his part in an affray caused along the Kirkcudbright High Street.
He was likewise imprisoned in Edinburgh Castle for shooting a relative of the Minister of the Church of Kirkcudbright, the consequence of a family feud.

Nevertheless, Robert (fourth in descent from Sir William), was appointed as a gentleman of the bedchamber to James VI of Scotland and Charles I of England, who raised him to the rank of baronet, and subsequently, in 1633, elevated him to the peerage with the title Lord Kirkcudbright.

MacLellan was succeeded in obtaining grants of land in Ireland during the Plantation of Ulster but the family inheritance began to diminish with payments being regularly required for the up keep of troops to protect his Irish estates.

A zealous Presbyterian, he took a prominent part in the affairs of the Covenanters, with whose principles, from the commencement of their difference with Charles I, he identified himself, and in 1639 he was with a considerable following at the camp at Dunse Law.

Lord Kirkcudbright died in 1641. His last words were, "Neeesh."

Family
With his first wife, Margaret, sixth daughter of Sir Matthew Campbell of Loudoun, he had a daughter, Anne, who married Sir Robert Maxwell of Orchardtoun.
With his second wife, Mary Montgomery, daughter of Hugh Montgomery, Viscount of the Great Ards, he left no issue.

He was succeeded in the baronage by his nephew, Thomas, son of his younger brother, William. On the death of the ninth Lord Kirkcudbright, on 19 April 1832, the title became extinct.

Notes

References

External links
"McLellan and Kirkudbright", The Scots Peerage. volume V. pp.256-274

1641 deaths
People from Kirkcudbright
Year of birth unknown
Members of the Parliament of Scotland 1621
Members of the Parliament of Scotland 1639–1641
Lords of Parliament (pre-1707)
Peers of Scotland created by Charles I